Diachrysia stenochrysis is a species of moth of the family Noctuidae. It is found in Europe, the Caucasus, the Far East, Primorye, Ussuri, Korea, Manchuria, Mongolia, Transbaikalia, Siberia and Japan.

The wingspan is 32–34 mm.
Warren (1914) states (original description) P. stenochrysis spec. nov. (64 f). As large as or larger than Diachrysia chrysitis, but with the forewing narrower;the costal portion of median fascia with conversely oblique edges, and nearly twice as wide on costa as in
Diachrysia nadeja Oberthür, 1880. Several examples from Ichikishiri, Yesso, in Tring Museum.

The larvae feed on Urtica species and other plants.

References

External links

Fauna Europaea
Lepiforum.de

Plusiinae
Moths of Japan
Moths of Europe
Moths described in 1913
Moths of Asia